Noen Phoem is a subdistrict in the Nakhon Thai District of Phitsanulok Province, Thailand.

Geography
Noen Phoem lies in the Nan Basin, which is part of the Chao Phraya Watershed.

Administration
The following is a list of the subdistrict's muban, which roughly correspond to the villages:

References

Tambon of Phitsanulok province
Populated places in Phitsanulok province